Greg Joseph (born 4 August 1994) is a South African professional American football placekicker for the Minnesota Vikings of the National Football League (NFL). He played college football at Florida Atlantic. He made his NFL debut in 2018 with the Cleveland Browns. He has also been a member of the Miami Dolphins, Carolina Panthers, Tennessee Titans, and Tampa Bay Buccaneers.

Early years
Joseph was born in Johannesburg, South Africa, to Glen and Ilana Joseph. He moved to West Boca Raton, Florida with his family in 2001 when he was seven years old, as his family sought to leave South Africa, and his mother had family in Florida. He has two younger brothers, Marc and Dylan.  He is Jewish, and says Judaism has "absolutely" guided him during his life.

He played football and soccer at Donna Klein Jewish Academy in Boca Raton, Florida, and also attended and played soccer (and was named all-county and all-state) and high school football (in which he was named all-county, all-state, and All-America by MaxPrep.com) at American Heritage School in Delray Beach, Florida.  He decided to focus on football after recognizing that he stood a much better chance of getting a college scholarship and going pro in football than in soccer.

College career
Joseph spent five years at Florida Atlantic University (FAU) in Boca Raton after walking onto the football team and redshirting his freshman year, and graduated in 2017 with a degree in exercise science and health promotion. He graduated as the Owls’ all-time leader in field goals made (57), points scored (336), PATs (point-after-touchdown) made (165; in 170 attempts), and field goals attempted. He also set the university's single-game records for PATs, field goals, points scored by kicking, and the Owls’ longest field goal (54 yards).

As of February 2019, he was working towards finishing his MBA at FAU.

Collegiate statistics

Professional career

Miami Dolphins
After going un-selected in the 2018 NFL Draft, Joseph was signed as a free agent by the Miami Dolphins.  He made all three of the kicks he attempted in the preseason. He was released by the Dolphins on 1 September 2018.

Cleveland Browns
Joseph was signed by the Cleveland Browns on 17 September 2018.  He replaced Zane Gonzalez, who was cut from the team after missing two field goals and two extra points the previous day. In a Week 5 game at home against the Baltimore Ravens, Joseph made his first career game-winning field goal, a 37-yard attempt. This helped the Browns win, in overtime, by a final score of 12–9.

In his one season with the Browns, he made 17 of his 20 field goal attempts, with a long of 51 (his misses were beyond 40 yards), and made 25-of-29 extra points.  He was 4-of-4 from 20-to-29 yards, 7-of-7 from 30-to-39 yards, 5-of-7 from 40-to-49 yards and 1-of-2 from 50-plus yards. In 2018, he handled 69 total kickoffs and achieved a touchback on 68.1% of them.

On 31 August 2019, Joseph was released during final roster cuts after losing the kicker job to rookie Austin Seibert.

Joseph was drafted in the fifth round of the fifth phase of the 2020 XFL Draft by the Seattle Dragons in October 2019.

Carolina Panthers
On 25 November 2019, Joseph was signed to the Carolina Panthers practice squad.

Tennessee Titans

On 18 December 2019, the Tennessee Titans signed Joseph to a three-year contract off Carolina's practice squad, after waiving kicker Ryan Santoso and placing kicker Ryan Succop on injured reserve. He made his debut with the Titans on 22 December, kicking four extra points in a 38–28 loss to the New Orleans Saints. Joseph went 5-for-5 on extra points in the Week 17 finale against the Houston Texans, winning 35–14.

Joseph did not attempt a field goal until his fifth game with the Titans when he made a 30-yard kick in the first quarter of the AFC Championship Game against the Kansas City Chiefs. He went 15-for-15 on extra points before his first field goal attempt.

The Titans waived Joseph on 3 September 2020, after signing Stephen Gostkowski to assume their kicking duties.

Tampa Bay Buccaneers
On 8 September 2020, Joseph signed to the practice squad of the Tampa Bay Buccaneers. He was elevated to the active roster on December 18 for the team's week 15 game against the Atlanta Falcons, and reverted to the practice squad after the game.

Minnesota Vikings
On 11 February 2021, Joseph signed with the Minnesota Vikings.

Joseph missed a game-winning 37-yard field goal attempt against the Arizona Cardinals on 19 September 2021. Three weeks later, he made a game-winning 54-yard field goal against the Detroit Lions. A week later, he missed another game-winning field goal against the Carolina Panthers, but the Vikings would go on to win the game in overtime. On 21 November 2021, Joseph made his second game-winning field goal of the season, a 29-yarder against the Green Bay Packers.

In Week 4 of the 2022 season, Joseph converted all five field goal attempts, including a 47-yard game-winner in a 28-25 win over the New Orleans Saints, earning NFC Special Teams Player of the Week. In a week 16 game against the New York Giants, Joseph hit a 61 yard game winning field goal in a 27-24 victory, also setting a Vikings franchise record for longest made field goal.

On 14 March 2023, Joseph signed a one-year contract extension with the Vikings.

NFL career statistics

See also
List of Jewish football players

References

External links
Cleveland Browns bio
FAU Owls bio
"Player interviews: Greg Joseph: I'm Always Confident in Myself and My Ability," titansonline.com.

1994 births
Living people
21st-century American Jews
American football placekickers
Carolina Panthers players
Cleveland Browns players
Florida Atlantic Owls football players
Jewish American sportspeople
Jewish South African sportspeople
Minnesota Vikings players
Players of American football from Florida
South African emigrants to the United States
South African expatriate sportspeople in the United States
South African players of American football
Sportspeople from Boca Raton, Florida
Sportspeople from Johannesburg
Tampa Bay Buccaneers players
Tennessee Titans players
American Heritage School (Florida) alumni